Thomas Carter (29 March 1882 – 11 September 1951) was an Irish politician whose career spanned two different time periods and political parties.

A shopkeeper, he was elected unopposed as a Sinn Féin Teachta Dála (TD) to the 2nd Dáil at the 1921 general election for the Leitrim–Roscommon North constituency. He supported the Anglo-Irish Treaty and voted in favour of it. He was re-elected unopposed as a pro-Treaty Sinn Féin TD at the 1922 general election. He was re-elected as a Cumann na nGaedheal TD for the Leitrim–Sligo constituency at the 1923 general election. He resigned on 30 October 1924 along with seven other TDs in opposition to the Government's actions to the so-called Irish Army Mutiny. The subsequent by-election held on 11 March 1925 was won by Samuel Holt of Sinn Féin.

Carter returned to politics when he was elected as a Fianna Fáil TD for the Athlone–Longford constituency at the 1943 general election. He was re-elected as a Fianna Fáil TD at the 1944 general election, and after constituency boundary changes he was elected for Longford–Westmeath at the 1948 general election. He retired from politics at the 1951 general election.

References

1882 births
1951 deaths
Early Sinn Féin TDs
Cumann na nGaedheal TDs
Fianna Fáil TDs
Members of the 2nd Dáil
Members of the 3rd Dáil
Members of the 4th Dáil
Members of the 11th Dáil
Members of the 12th Dáil
Members of the 13th Dáil
People of the Irish Civil War (Pro-Treaty side)